Sadism may refer to:
 Sadomasochism, the giving or receiving of pleasure from acts involving the receipt or infliction of pain or humiliation
 Sadistic personality disorder, an obsolete term proposed for individuals who derive pleasure from the suffering of others
 Sexual sadism disorder, a medical/psychological condition for sexual arousal from inflicting pain/humiliation on unwilling, non-consenting victims

See also 
 BDSM, sadomasochistic play between consenting adults
 Sadist (disambiguation)
 Marquis de Sade (1740–1814), 18th-century French writer, from whom the term sadism was coined